Culex (Eumelanomyia) malayi is a species of mosquito belonging to the genus Culex. It is found in Bangladesh, Cambodia, China, India, Indonesia, Malaysia, Maldives, Myanmar, Nepal, Pakistan, Sri Lanka, Thailand, Taiwan, Timor and Vietnam.

References 

malayi
Insects described in 1908